The 1911 Imperial Conference convened in London on 23 May 1911 and concluded on 20 June 1911. It was held to mark the occasion of the coronation of King George V on 22 June 1911.

The conference discussed Empire-wide constitutional arrangements with proposals by New Zealand's prime minister Sir Joseph Ward for an imperial council made up of representatives of the dominions which would advise the British government on imperial matters. Ward developed this idea into a proposal for an Imperial Parliament (see Imperial Federation) which would be responsible for the Empire's foreign policy including the declaration of war and would be presided over by an Imperial executive. British prime minister H. H. Asquith rejected these proposals as infringing on British autonomy in making foreign policy but he agreed it was necessary to consult with dominion prime ministers on certain matters. Asquith proposed a standing committee on foreign affairs but the dominion prime ministers could not agree on a final resolution.

The conference came to an agreement on the negotiation of treaties that affect various dominions and that the British government would consult the dominions when preparing its proposals for proposed international Peace Conferences and that future international peace treaties and some international agreements would be circulated to the dominions for comment prior to the British government signing them.

Australia expressed concern about Japan's growing naval power and it was agreed that the British government would consult Australia when negotiating renewal of the Anglo-Japanese Alliance. Britain also agreed to consult South Africa about negotiations with Germany considering its colonial aspirations in Africa.

Participants
The conference was hosted by King-Emperor George V, with his Prime Ministers and members of their respective cabinets:

See also
Imperial Conference

References

External links
Minutes of the 1911 Imperial Conference

Imperial Conference
1911 in London
1911 in international relations
1911 in the British Empire
1911 conferences
May 1911 events
June 1911 events
George V
H. H. Asquith
David Lloyd George
Winston Churchill
Wilfrid Laurier